Bluefinger is an album by Black Francis ( Frank Black). The album was released on 11 September 2007 in the United States and Europe.  The project was revealed via several cryptic posts by Black on his unofficial website, which were confirmed as accurate when the album leaked to file-sharing services earlier in the year.

All of the songs on the album reference Dutch musician and artist Herman Brood (1946-2001), some directly and some indirectly. In addition, "You Can't Break a Heart and Have It" is a Brood cover. The title of the album, Bluefinger, is also a direct reference to the birthplace of Brood, who was born in the Dutch city of Zwolle, of which the citizens are colloquially known as Blauwvingers (Bluefingers).

The song "Threshold Apprehension" was #90 on Rolling Stones list of the 100 Best Songs of 2007.

"You Can't Break a Heart and Have It" was included in the soundtrack for Forgetting Sarah Marshall.

In 2010, Bluefinger was adapted into a play/rock opera, in collaboration with Jason Nodler, for Houston's acclaimed Catastrophic Theatre.

Track listing

Personnel 
Credits adapted from the album's liner notes.
Musicians
 Black Francis – vocals, guitar, harmonica, keyboards
 Dan Schmid – bass
 Jason Carter – drums
 Violet Clark – vocals
 Mark Lemhouse – percussion, background vocals
Technical
 Mark Lemhouse – producer
 Thaddeus Moore – engineer
 Jason Carter – engineer, mixing
 Myles Mangino – mastering, mixing
 James Jefferson – design
 Julian Clark - artwork
 Richard Hermitage – management

References 

2007 albums
Black Francis albums
Cooking Vinyl albums